Chuta Kunka (Aymara chuta end of a terrain, border, kunka throat, "border's throat", hispanicized spelling Chutacunca) is a mountain in the Andes of Peru, about  high. It is located in the Puno Region, El Collao Province, Santa Rosa District, southeast of Sukata Laq'a and Chuqi Quta.

References

Mountains of Puno Region
Mountains of Peru